Milan Melindo (born February 29, 1988) is a Filipino professional boxer who held the IBF and IBO light-flyweight titles in 2017. He also challenged for the unified WBA (Super) and WBO flyweight titles in 2013 and the IBF, WBA (Super), and WBC light-flyweight titles between 2015 and 2018.

Early life
Milan Melindo was born on February 29, 1988, in Cagayan de Oro, Philippines. His passion for boxing came from his father, who bought him a pair of boxing gloves. When Melindo was 6 years of age his father trained him and introduce him to the sport of boxing. Growing up, Melindo took boxing as a hobby because it was through this sport he was able to continue his study through a scholarship program. When he graduated from high school, Melindo decided to take boxing seriously to help his family’s financial needs. Melindo kept his unbeaten record going by defeating his veteran opponent via unanimous decision with the scores of 97-93, 98-92, and 96-94.

Fighting style
Melindo is considered one of the most skillful and promising boxers in the now-disbanded ALA (Antonio Lopez Aldeguer) boxing gym, although somewhat lacking in punching power. In fact, he scored only 13 KO's in 37 wins; most of these KO victories came when he was fighting in the minimumweight division.
Despite the lack of punching power, he makes up for it with his quick combinations and his ability to double-up his patented left hook.

Professional career

Early years at minimumweight
Melindo made his professional debut on September 17, 2005, defeating fellow Filipino boxer Meljun Grumo by unanimous decision at the Sports and Cultural Complex in Mandaue City, Cebu, Philippines.

Melindo won his first ever title, the vacant WBO Asia Pacific minimumweight championship, on October 6, 2007, by defeating Pongpan Patanakan Gym of Thailand via technical knockout in the 4th round. The two fought at the Mindanao Polytechnic State College in Cagayan de Oro. The Thai boxer was floored two times in the round, and the bout was stopped after a devastating knockout that left him unconscious for several minutes. Melindo defended the title in his next fight against Jack Amisa, whom he defeated by unanimous decision on December 2, 2007.

On March 14, 2009, Melindo took on Indonesia's Muhammad Rachman at the Waterfront Cebu City Hotel in Cebu City, Cebu. He kept his unbeaten record going by defeating his veteran opponent via unanimous decision with the scores of 97-93, 98-92, and 96-94.

Light flyweight
Melindo won the WBA Inter-Continental light flyweight title on July 26, 2008, by defeating Carlos Melo from Panama at the Cebu Coliseum in Cebu City. Melindo won on points with scores of 117-111, 116-112 and 117-111.

Flyweight
On January 14, 2010, Melindo fought Anthony Villareal for the World Boxing Council (WBC) Youth Intercontinental flyweight championship belt at the Waterfront Cebu City Hotel. The bout was part of the boxing event named "Bakbakan sa Sinulog". The unbeaten boxer defeated his foe by unanimous decision with the scores of :97-93, 95-94, and 96-93. Melindo kept his unbeaten record after 20 fights with five of his wins coming by way of knockout, while his opponent suffered his third loss against nine wins (4 KO).

After letting the deposed champion to take control of the action in the opening minutes of the first round, Melindo picked up the pace in the final half by knocking down Villareal in the final seconds with a solid right during an exchange. Stunned but not totally hurt by Melindo’s right, Villareal again started out strong in the second but his aggressiveness was once again silenced by another right from the Filipino challenger. Melindo slowly took control of the fight in the third round, when he began to throw more powerful against the tough opponent. Villareal became desperate to turn things around in the final rounds when he threw punches in volumes but most of his shots were wild and didn't hit Melindo.

Melindo was scheduled to face Devis Perez of Colombia on April 10, 2010 at the Dubai Tennis Arena in Dubai, United Arab Emirates. However, the fight was postponed to April 23 because of the non appearance of Bobby Pacquiao in one of the featured fights on April 9.

A day before the fight, Perez was replaced by Thailand's Komrit Twinsgym, who arrived only the previous night in Dubai as a last minute replacement of original opponent of Columbia who failed to make his way here after flights in Europe were disrupted due to Iceland volcanic ash hovering above the continent. The Melindo-Twinsgym bout was the Filipino's first fight outside the Philippines. The Cagayan de Oro native won the bout by TKO in the 4th round.

The undefeated fighter Melindo (21-0-0, 6KO) who was defending his WBC Youth Intercontinental title, floored Komrit Twinsgym (15-4-0, 11KO) in the first minute of the first round and again towards the end of the round looking to make short work of the travel-weary Thai. Komrit refused to let go and flurried Melindo with some combinations during heated exchanges with the stalking Melindo in the second and third round. Komrit was caught by Melindo's solid punches in the fourth round and was sent to the canvas again. Veteran referee Bruce McTavish didn't count the Thai boxer and stopped the contest, allowing Melindo to retain his title. On August 28, 2010, Melindo fought Jin-Man Jeon at the Waterfront Cebu City Hotel in Cebu. The Filipino pugilist won the bout by TKO in the 2nd round.

Other events
On March 11, 2010, Melindo received an award in the 28th SAC-SMB Cebu Sports Awards, along with four other Filipino boxers: Z Gorres, Donnie Nietes, Rodel Mayol and Johnriel Casimero. The event was organized by the Sportswriters Association of Cebu (SAC) and held at the Casino Español de Cebu.

Professional boxing record

Titles in boxing 
Major World Titles:
IBF Light Flyweight Champion (108 lbs)
Minor World Titles:
IBF Interim Light Flyweight Champion (November 2016) (108 lbs) 
Regional/International Titles:
WBO International Flyweight Champion (June 2012) (November 2013) (2x)(112 lbs) 
WBO Inter-Continental Flyweight Champion (September 2011) (112 lbs)
WBA Inter-Continental Light Flyweight Champion (July 2008) (108 lbs)
WBO Asia Pacific Minimumweight Champion (October 2007) (105 lbs)

See also 
List of light-flyweight boxing champions

References

External links

Milan Melindo's blog

1988 births
Living people
Mini-flyweight boxers
Light-flyweight boxers
Flyweight boxers
World light-flyweight boxing champions
International Boxing Federation champions
Sportspeople from Cagayan de Oro
Boxers from Misamis Oriental
Filipino male boxers